Piniphantes is a genus of dwarf spiders that was first described by Michael I. Saaristo & A. V. Tanasevitch in 1996.

Species
 it contains nine species:
Piniphantes agnellus (Maurer & Thaler, 1988) – France, Italy
Piniphantes cinereus (Tanasevitch, 1986) – Kyrgyzstan
Piniphantes cirratus (Thaler, 1986) – France (Corsica)
Piniphantes himalayensis (Tanasevitch, 1987) – Nepal, Pakistan
Piniphantes macer (Tanasevitch, 1986) – Kyrgyzstan
Piniphantes pinicola (Simon, 1884) (type) – Europe, Turkey, Caucasus, Turkmenistan
Piniphantes plumatus (Tanasevitch, 1986) – Kyrgyzstan
Piniphantes uzbekistanicus (Tanasevitch, 1983) – Uzbekistan, Kyrgyzstan
Piniphantes zonsteini (Tanasevitch, 1989) – Uzbekistan, Kyrgyzstan

See also
 List of Linyphiidae species (I–P)

References

Araneomorphae genera
Linyphiidae
Spiders of Asia